Malaka Sari is a village (kelurahan) of Duren Sawit, East Jakarta, Indonesia.

Villages of Duren Sawit